UIP may refer to:
 uIP (micro IP), an embedded TCP/IP protocol stack intended for small 8-bit and 16-bit microcontrollers
 United Independent Party, a political party based in Massachusetts, United States
 United International Pictures, a film distributor
 Universal Immunization Programme, a vaccination program launched by the Government of India in 1985
 , a school in Panama run by Laureate Education
 University of Illinois Press, an American university press
 Usual interstitial pneumonia, a form of lung disease characterized by progressive scarring of both lungs
 Quimper–Cornouaille Airport's IATA code
 Fine Gael, a political party in Ireland historically referred to as the  “United Ireland Party”